Conductors of Chaos: A Poetry Anthology is a poetry anthology edited by Iain Sinclair, and published in the United Kingdom in 1996 by Picador. 

Sinclair in the Introduction wrote that "The secret history of ... 'the British Poetry Revival' ... is as arcane a field of study as the heresies and schisms of the early Church."

The selection includes both a number of 'Revival' poets, and a few figures chosen as 'precursors', with some deliberate scheme of comment on the contemporary as well as the retrospection involving the 1960s and 1970s.

Poets in Conductors of Chaos: A Poetry Anthology

See also
 1996 in poetry
 1996 in literature
 English poetry
 List of poetry anthologies

References

1996 anthologies
1996 poetry books
British poetry anthologies
British Poetry Revival